Nehemiah Odolphus Perry (born  16 June 1968) is a former cricketer from Jamaica who played four Tests and 21 One Day Internationals for the West Indies between 1999 and 2000. He was a member of the West Indies squad at the 1999 Cricket World Cup, and also represented Jamaica at the 1998 Commonwealth Games.

He has three sons, and his eldest is a professional footballer. He retired from all cricket due to his age and a consistent pain in his wrists in 2004. His best bowling performance of 5/70 came on debut against Australia in a famous West Indian victory where Brian Lara scored 213.

See also
 List of West Indies cricketers who have taken five-wicket hauls on Test debut

References

1968 births
Living people
Sportspeople from Kingston, Jamaica
Jamaican cricketers
West Indies One Day International cricketers
West Indies Test cricketers
Commonwealth Games competitors for Jamaica
Cricketers at the 1998 Commonwealth Games
Cricketers who have taken five wickets on Test debut
Jamaica cricketers
Cricketers at the 1999 Cricket World Cup